The football (soccer) Campeonato Brasileiro Série C 2002, the third level of Brazilian National League, was played from August 24 to December 1, 2002. The competition had 65 clubs and two of them were promoted to Série B.

Brasiliense finished the final phase group with most points and was declared 2002 Brazilian Série C champions, claiming the promotion to the 2003 Série B along with Marília, the runners-up.

Stages of the competition

First stage
Promoted to the second stage

Group 1 (AC-AM-RO-RR)

Group 2 (AP-PA-TO)

Group 3 (MA)

Group 4 (CE-MA-PI)

Group 5 (PB-RN)

Group 6 (AL-SE)

Group 7 (BA-SE)

Group 8 (ES-MG)

Group 9 (DF-GO)

Group 10 (GO-MT-MS)

Group 11 (GO-MG)

Group 12 (RJ)

Group 13 (SP)

Group 14 (SP)

Group 15 (PR)

Group 16 (RS-SC)

Second stage

[

Third stage

Quarterfinals

Final stage

Sources
 rsssf.com

2002 in Brazilian football leagues
Campeonato Brasileiro Série C seasons